The  International League season took place between April and September 2004.

The Buffalo Bisons defeated the Richmond Braves to win the league championship.

Attendance
Buffalo - 604,159
Charlotte - 265,271
Columbus - 493,656
Durham - 493,629
Indianapolis - 576,067
Louisville - 648,092
Norfolk - 485,260
Ottawa - 159,619
Pawtucket - 657,067
Richmond - 375,029
Rochester - 437,088
Scranton/W.B. - 402,676
Syracuse - 364,648
Toledo - 544,778

Playoffs
The following teams qualified for the postseason:  Buffalo Bisons, Columbus Clippers, Durham Bulls, and Richmond Braves.

Division Series
Buffalo defeated Durham 3 games to 2

Richmond defeated Columbus 3 game to 1

Championship series
Buffalo defeated the Richmond Braves 3 games to 1
Note: all games were played in Buffalo due to weather conditions (the remnants of Hurricane Ivan) in Richmond.

References

External links
International League official website

 
International League seasons